The Men's 100 metre butterfly S13 swimming event at the 2004 Summer Paralympics was competed on 19 September. It was won by Charalampos Taiganidis, representing .

1st round

Heat 1
19 Sept. 2004, morning session

Heat 2
19 Sept. 2004, morning session

Final round

19 Sept. 2004, evening session

References

M